(August 17, 1961) in Chiba is a Japanese scholar of Japanese literature and college professor from Chiba, Chiba. He was the Japanese voice actor for the Disney character Mickey Mouse from 1991 until 2018.

Biography 
Aoyagi graduated from the Chiba Ritsu Senior High School and Chiba University. He also took a post-graduate course in the University of Tsukuba. He is a professor in Tokyo Seitoku University. He specializes in kanshi and waka. He formally provided the voice of Mickey Mouse as a side job from 1991 until November 2018, when the voice acting role was taken over by Takanori Hoshino.

Roles

Dubbing roles
Productions for The Walt Disney Company from 1991 until 2018 (Mickey Mouse)

Video games
Kingdom Hearts (King Mickey)
Kingdom Hearts Birth by Sleep (King Mickey)
Kingdom Hearts Re:Chain of Memories (King Mickey)
Kingdom Hearts 358/2 Days (King Mickey)
Kingdom Hearts II (King Mickey) 
Disney Epic Mickey 2: The Power of Two (Mickey Mouse)
Kingdom Hearts III (King Mickey)

References

External links
Home page
Credits at IMDb

1961 births
Japanese male voice actors
Living people
Voice actors from Chiba (city)
Male voice actors from Chiba Prefecture
Japanese literature academics
Chiba University alumni
University of Tsukuba alumni